Buddhadeb Bhattacharjee (born 1 March 1944) is an Indian Communist politician and a former member of the Politburo of the Communist Party of India (Marxist). He served as the 7th Chief Minister of West Bengal from 2000 to 2011.
He is a senior leader of Communist Party of India (Marxist), having served as a member of the politburo between 2002 and 2015. Bhattacharjee is known for leading a spartan and honest livelihood.

Early life 
Born in 1944 in north Calcutta, Buddhadeb Bhattacharjee belongs to a family which had produced another famous son. Revolutionary poet Sukanta Bhattacharya was his father's cousin. A former student of Sailendra Sircar Vidyalaya, Bhattacharjee had his ancestral house in Bangladesh. He studied Bengali literature at the Presidency College, Kolkata, and secured his B.A. degree in Bengali (Honors), and joined a government school as a teacher.

Early political career
He joined the CPI(M) as a primary member in 1966. Besides taking active part in the food movement, he also supported Vietnam's cause in 1968. In 1968, he was elected state secretary of the Democratic Youth Federation, the youth wing of the CPI(M) that was later merged into the Democratic Youth Federation of India. He served in the position till 1981, when he was succeeded by Boren Basu. He was mentored by Pramod Dasgupta.

Political career
Bhattacharjee was elected to the state committee of CPI(M) in 1972 and was inducted in the state secretariat in 1982.

At first he was the MLA of Kashipur-Belgachia from 1977 to 1982. Bhattacharjee served as Minister in West Bengal Cabinet as Minister of Information and Public Relations between 1977 and 1982.

He lost the assembly elections in 1982 from Cossipur constituency in 1982 by a slender margin. He was made a permanent invitee to the central committee of CPI(M) in 1984 and was made a member in 1985.

Later he became the MLA of Jadavpur in 1987 and continued to represent the constituency till 2011. He was re-inducted in the cabinet in 1987 minister of Information and Cultural Affairs. He also held other departments, such as urban development and tourism, on temporary basis.

He was included in the cabinet in 1991 as Information and Cultural Affairs minister, however, he abruptly resigned from his position in September 1993 following differences with the chief minister on the functioning of the administration and the alleged issue of corruption.  He returned to the cabinet a few months later.

In 1996, after the 1996 West Bengal election Bhattacharjee was handed over the responsibility of home and police department, owing to the old health of Chief Minister Jyoti Basu. In 1999, he was made the Deputy Chief minister Deputy Chief Minister of West Bengal of West Bengal.

On November 6, 2000, he was elevated to the position of Chief Minister after Basu stepped down. In 2002, he was elected to the politburo of CPI(M).

Chief Minister of West Bengal 

Bhattacharjee was elected Chief Minister of West Bengal and was sworn in a solemn ceremony at Raj Bhawan.

As Chief Minister, he lead the CPI(M)-led Left Front Left Front (West Bengal) to two successive election victory in 2001 and 2006. In 2001, Left Front  secured 199 out of 294 assembly seats and in 2006, it improved the tally to 235 out of 294 seats.

He started an industrialization drive in West Bengal to bring in more investment and jobs in the states. Under his government West Bengal saw investments in IT and services sector.

However, he took the biggest risk of his political career by embarking upon the industrialization drive to change the face of West Bengal, which had agriculture as primary source of income. He deviated from the standard Marxist doctrine to invite foreign and national capital to set up factories in West Bengal. Notable among them was the world's cheapest car, Tata Nano, from a small hamlet near Kolkata called Singur. There were other proposals too, such as country's largest integrated steel plant in Salboni, West Midanpore district by Jindal group, and a chemical hub at Nayachar after it faced agrarian resistance in Nandigram.

However, his plans backfired, and his party, along with its front partners, suffered heavy losses in the 2009 Lok Sabha election. In the 2011 state assembly election he was defeated by former Chief Secretary of his own government,  and the Trinamool congress candidate Manish Gupta by 16,684 votes.

He is the second West Bengal Chief Minister to lose an election from his own constituency, after Prafulla Chandra Sen in 1967.The Left Front saw a drubbing, securing just 62 seats out of 294. He resigned as Chief Minister on May 13, 2011.

Singur Tata Nano controversy and Nandigram violence 

Events during his tenure as Chief Minister included attempts to industrialize West Bengal thwarted by the TATA's Tata Motors leaving Bengal in the face of the joint protests of the Trinamool Congress, Socialist Unity Centre of India, and Indian National Congress, the land acquisition dispute in Singur, the Nandigram incident, and the Netai incident.

In January 2006 the Supreme Court of India issued notices to Left Front Government ministers including Buddhadeb Bhattacharjee and others in relation to land allotments made in the Salt Lake City township in Kolkata.

Buddhadeb Bhattacharjee's Government came under heavy criticism for police action against demonstrators in Nandigram in East Midnapore. He was criticized not only by opposition parties (such as the Trinamool congress, Party of Democratic Socialism, Bharatiya Janata Party, Communist Party of India (Marxist–Leninist) Liberation, Communist Revolutionary League of India and others) and other Left Front coalition allies like Communist Party of India, Revolutionary Socialist Party (India) and Forward Bloc, who threatened to back out from the ministry on this issue, but also by his mentor and the state's former chief minister, Jyoti Basu.

On March 15, 2007 Basu criticized Bhattacharjee for failing to restrain the police in Nandigram. Bhattacharjee expressed regret for the shootings, but claimed that he permitted police action because Nandigram was an "area where there had been no rule of law and no presence of an administration for not one, two or 10 days but for two-and-a-half months, and many hundreds of villagers left Nandigram, and took shelter in a state relief camp outside Nandigram." Actually Buddhadeb Bhattacharjee declared that land in Nandigram won't be acquired by ordering the Nandigram notification to be torn apart. Still police were not allowed to enter Nandigram. Roads were dug up, preventing administration from entering the area.

The CPI(M) declared that they were totally behind Bhattacharjee and had drawn up "plans" to placate his critics in the Left Front. His government was also criticized by Left supporters for failing to protect the Left party workers (including his own party CPI(M)) who came under assault from political opponents - both right wing and ultra-left wing Maoists during the post-Nandigram turmoil until the end of 7th Left Front Government.

Later life 
Despite his calls to be relieved of party responsibilities, Bhattacharjee was retained as a member of the politburo and the central committee in the 20th party congress, organised at Kozhikode in 2012.

He was relieved of his posts on the Politburo and Central Committee at the 21st party congress, organised at Vishakhapatnam in 2015. The party congress elected him as a special invitee to the Central Committee. However, he was persuaded to remain a member of the state committee and the state secretariat till 2018.

He continued to appear for party campaign and programs till 2017.

In 2018, due to continuing ill-health he stepped down from the state committee and the state secretariat. He was later named as a special invitee to the state committee. In 2019, he made a attempt to attend a mega-rally at Brigade Parade ground in Kolkata, however, due to breathing difficulties he could not appear on the stage and remained seated in his car.

In 2022, he stepped down from all leadership roles, just retaining his primary membership of the party. However, Bhattacharjee remains a senior leader of CPI(M).

The Padma Bhushan controversy

In January 2022, the Central Government of India bestowed Bhattacharjee with the Padma Bhushan, the third-highest civilian award in India. However, he declined the award and claimed that he had not been informed about the award. He said a call was made to his residence earlier in the day, while adding there is no provision of taking consent for giving Padma awards.

Later, the CPI(M) General Secretary Sitaram Yechury clarified Bhattacharjee's stance in a tweet which said
Former Party PB [Politburo] member & WB [West Bengal] CM Buddhadeb Bhattacharya [Bhattacharjee] had this to say on the Padma Bhushan award announcement. “I don't know anything about Padman Bhusan award, none has said anything about it. If I have been given Padma Bhushan I refuse to accept it.”

Personal life

He is married to Meera Bhattacharjee; they have a daughter. The family has lived in a two-room apartment in Ballygunge, Kolkata. He stayed at the two-room apartment for decades and operated as Chief Minister from the same residence.

During Bhattacharjee's time in the cabinet, he made efforts to enhance literary culture in Bengal.

As Information and Culture minister he undertook significant projects such as building Nandan, a film complex modelled on the British Film Institute; Bangla Akademi, a book publishing organisation and Rabindra Bhavans in all districts.

Published works
 বিপন্ন জাহাজের এক নাবিকের গল্প- Translated works of Colombian writer Gabriel García Márquez (1994)- On February 28, 1955, a Colombian Navy ship "Caladus" was hit by a storm in the Caribbean Sea. The ship started from Mobile, a port city in the US state of Alabama. The destination was the port of Cartagena, Colombia. The ship made it safely to the port of Cartagena but only one person survived. Buddhadev Bhattacharya translated the book 'The Story of a Shipwrecked Sailor'

 ‘’দুঃসময়’’(1993) - Buddhadeb Bhattacharya's play deals with the bitter truth prevalent even in today's society—the communal tension between Hindus and Muslims.

 এই আমি মায়াকভস্কি (1994) - Translated works of Russian-Soviet poet Vladimir Mayakovsky

 চিলিতে গোপনে- Translated works of Colombian writer Gabriel García Márquez (1996)- September 11, 1973 was a dark day in Chile's modern history. General Pinochet's military seized power in a violent coup against the left-wing government of Salvador Allende. Thousands of people were sent into exile. Attacks were concentrated on communists, socialists and leftists. Famous Chilean director Miguel Litín was exiled from the country soon after the coup. Later his name was included in the declared list of undesirable persons. Twelve years later, he entered Chile under the guise of a false identity to film his country and its people in the ravages of military rule. He narrated the harrowing story to his close friend, the renowned novelist Gabriel García Márquez. Marquez recorded the expedition in his book 'Clandestine in Chile'. Buddhadev Bhattacharya translated the book 'Clandestine in Chile'.

 ফিরে দেখা (প্রথম পর্ব) (2015)- Not an out and out reminiscence,this book is e flashback„ with some well-constructed montages of a momentous past.It propels the readers to early five years of the Left Front Government in West Bengal(1977-1982)

 ফিরে দেখা (দ্বিতীয় পর্ব) (2017)- This is a frank and concise account of the last decade (2001-2011) of the Left Front Government in West Bengal, India, by the communist leader who headed it.The author does not avoid controversial issues like the movement at Singur and Nandigram against his government while focusing on developmental goals and achievements of which he and the Left can be justly proud.

 নাৎসি জার্মানির জন্ম ও মৃত্যু- (2018) The book consists of 14 chapters excluding the preface and appendix. So that – from this Hitler to the last days of Hitler. From the Prime Minister to the Fuehrer, Russia's struggle for self-defense, the fall of Germany and Italy, the concentration camps, etc., are told.

 স্বর্গের নিচে মহাবিশৃঙ্খলা (2019)- In this 72-page book, the former chief minister of the state has highlighted the evolution of a huge history - from the construction of the great wall of China to prevent the Mongolian invasion to the world power of the Chinese information technology company 'Alibaba' in this era of globalization.

References

External links

Danger of Fascism: Buddhadeb Bhattacharjee

1944 births
20th-century atheists
21st-century atheists
Living people
Presidency University, Kolkata alumni
Communist Party of India (Marxist) politicians from West Bengal
Anti-Americanism
Indian communists
Indian anti-capitalists
Indian atheists
Anti-capitalists
Anti-imperialism
Politicians from Kolkata
Chief Ministers of West Bengal
University of Calcutta alumni
Marxist writers
Marxist theorists
Marxist humanists
Chief ministers from Communist Party of India (Marxist)
Deputy chief ministers of West Bengal